Tom Buttgenbach is an American businessman in the solar industry. He is the co-founder, CEO and President of 8minute Solar Energy (previously 8minutenergy Renewables LLC), an independent solar and storage developer in the U.S.

Biography 
He attended the University of Cologne in Germany for his undergraduate studies in Physics and Mathematics and earned a Ph.D. from the California Institute of Technology (Caltech) in physics and astronomy, where he attended as a Fulbright Scholar. His thesis advisor was Thomas G. Phillips. 

Before founding 8minute Solar Energy, Buttgenbach worked in management consulting with McKinsey & Company, investment banking and real estate development. 

In December 2018, Buttgenbach launched a $200 million joint venture along with J.P. Morgan Asset Management and an affiliate of Upper Bay Infrastructure Partners. In December 2018, Buttgenbach purchased the shares of fellow co-founder Martin Hermann from 8minutenergy Renewables, LLC. As of June 2019, the company made an official name change to 8minute Solar Energy. In 2022, 8minute Solar Energy announced they had secured $400 million in financing from institutional investor EIG.

A lawsuit accuses him of misappropriating the University of California system’s money after the latter invested in a collection of solar projects. The complaint, filed in January in Alameda County Superior Court, claims that Buttgenbach submitted false claims to the university system to induce solar project investments worth $150 million, which he allegedly used to enrich himself. The public university's regents allege that Buttgenbach fraudulently induced it to invest in a collection of solar development projects in early 2020, then he misappropriated much of the capital and used it to enrich himself. \ 8minute Solar Energy and Buttgenbach described the allegations at the time as “baseless and frivolous.” The UC system’s allegations mirror claims previously brought by 8minute Solar Energy's Class B investors, which included the UC and its investment partners. All of the Class B investors’ claims were dismissed or rejected as a result of arbitration that concluded with 8minute Solar Energy and Buttgenbach awarded fees and damages in February of 2022. A review by the law firm Brown Rudnick LLP found the UC system’s claims to be meritless and discovered evidence of wrongdoing on the part of the UC Regent’s investment agent, a finding that was later confirmed by an arbitrator.

Buttgenbach and his companies have worked with the Sierra Club to ensure solar development protects the environment. Buttgenbach is on the Green Advisory Board of the California League of Conservation Voters and sits on the board of directors for the Los Angeles Business Council. In 2020, he was named an Entrepreneur of The Year for Greater Los Angeles by Ernst & Young. He was recognized as a Visionary in the L.A. Times’ C-Suite: Trends, Updates and Visionaries Magazine for 2022.

References 

American company founders